Aristov is a Russian surname of Greek roots. Notable people with this surname include:
 Averky Aristov, a Soviet politician and diplomat
 Nikolai Aristov, a Russian turkologist
 Viktor Aristov (football manager), a Ukrainian football manager from Russia

References
 

Russian-language surnames